The 1948 Wyoming Cowboys football team represented the University of Wyoming in the Skyline Six Conference during the 1948 college football season. In their second season under head coach Bowden Wyatt, the Cowboys compiled a 4–5 record (0–5 against Skyline Six opponents), finished sixth in the conference, and outscored all opponents by a total of 270 to 145.

Eddie Talboom played in the backfield. He later became the first Wyoming player to be inducted into the College Football Hall of Fame. Head coach Bowden Wyatt was also inducted into the College Football Hall of Fame as a coach in 1997.

Schedule

References

Wyoming
Wyoming Cowboys football seasons
Wyoming Cowboys football